Néstor Albiach Roger (born 18 August 1992), simply known as Néstor, is a Spanish professional footballer who plays for CF Badalona. Mainly an attacking midfielder, he can also play as a winger.

Club career

Early years
Born in Xirivella, Valencian Community, Néstor was a Levante UD youth graduate, but made his debut as a senior with SC Requena in the 2011–12 campaign, in Tercera División.

In August 2012 Néstor moved to Segunda División B side CD Olímpic de Xàtiva. On 25 January of the following year, after being an ever-present figure for the side, he rescinded his contract and signed a two-year deal with Czech First League side FK Dukla Prague.

Czech Republic
Néstor made his professional debut on 22 February 2013, starting in a 1–1 home draw for Dukla against FK Teplice. He scored his first league goals on 13 April, netting a brace in a 5–1 home routing of FK Jablonec.

Néstor was shortlisted for the league's Player of the Month award for May 2013, after having scored in wins against FC Zbrojovka Brno (3–2) and FK Mladá Boleslav (2–1) during the month. He was also elected as the best foreigner of the league in June.

Néstor sustained an injury during the winter break of the 2013–14 season, being sidelined until August 2014 when he came on as a substitute in a 1–2 defeat at FC Viktoria Plzeň. Despite having injury troubles with both knees, he remained at Dukla until the winter break of the 2016–17 season.

After scoring five goals for Dukla in the autumn part of the 2016–17 season, Néstor signed with Sparta Prague in December 2016, joining on a -year contract.

Badalona / Numancia
In January 2019, free agent Néstor returned to Spain and signed for CF Badalona in the third division. On 13 June 2019, he agreed to a two-year contract with CD Numancia in Segunda División.

On 7 September 2020, after appearing sparingly as his side suffered relegation, Néstor returned to his previous club Badalona.

References

External links

1992 births
Living people
People from Horta Oest
Sportspeople from the Province of Valencia
Spanish footballers
Footballers from the Valencian Community
Association football forwards
Segunda División players
Segunda División B players
Tercera División players
CD Olímpic de Xàtiva footballers
CF Badalona players
CD Numancia players
Czech First League players
FK Dukla Prague players
AC Sparta Prague players
Spanish expatriate footballers
Expatriate footballers in the Czech Republic
Spanish expatriate sportspeople in the Czech Republic